SpySubtract was the name of an Anti-Spyware application for Microsoft Windows developed by InterMute. It was maintained by Trend Micro under the new name of Trend Micro Anti-Spyware, which came into effect from version 3.0. Previous versions did not have the Trend Micro branding.

Trend Micro Anti-Spyware was later discontinued on November 30, 2007, and replaced with Trend Micro AntiVirus plus AntiSpyware 2008.

The program is shareware, and was available to download as a 30-day trial.

Previously, SpySubtract was often pre-installed on new desktop and notebook computers.

References

Spyware removal